Jostein Rise (born 1945) is a Norwegian social psychologist.

He is the director of the Norwegian Institute for Alcohol and Drug Research from 1 October 2005, having worked there since 2002. He has been a professor at the University of Bergen, and assisting professor (professor II) at the Norwegian University of Science and Technology and the University of Oslo.

References

1945 births
Living people
Directors of government agencies of Norway
Academic staff of the University of Bergen
Academic staff of the Norwegian University of Science and Technology
Academic staff of the University of Oslo
Norwegian psychologists